The Nemaha County Courthouse is a historic building in Auburn, Nebraska, and the courthouse of Nemaha County, Nebraska. It was built by W. M. Rowles & Company in 1899, and designed in the Romanesque Revival style by German-born architect George A. Berlinghof. It has been listed on the National Register of Historic Places since January 10, 1990.

References

National Register of Historic Places in Nemaha County, Nebraska
Romanesque Revival architecture in Nebraska
Government buildings completed in 1899
1899 establishments in Nebraska